Mearley is a civil parish in Lancashire, England.  The parish is north-west of Pendle Hill, east of Clitheroe, and is in the Ribble Valley district. It is a small parish with no villages or hamlets and a population of 25, the second smallest in Lancashire, at the 2001 census. It has no parish council, but instead has a parish meeting shared with neighbouring Worston. From the 2011 Census population information for both Mearley and Worston is included within the civil parish of Pendleton, giving a total of 349. The eastern part of the parish is included in the Pendle outlier section of the Forest of Bowland Area of Outstanding Natural Beauty (AONB).

The parish adjoins the Ribble Valley parishes of Worston, Clitheroe, Pendleton and Sabden, along with Goldshaw Booth in the Borough of Pendle.

Mearley was once a township in the ancient parish of Whalley. This became a civil parish in 1866, forming part of the Clitheroe Rural District from 1894 till 1974.

Along with Wiswell and Barrow (since 2015), both Mearley and Worston form the Wiswell and Pendleton ward of Ribble Valley Borough Council.

See also

Listed buildings in Mearley

References

External links

 Worston and Mearley Parish Meeting
 The Victoria History of the County of Lancaster Vol 6

Civil parishes in Lancashire
Geography of Ribble Valley